The Hong Kong coinage, including 10¢, 20¢, 50¢, $1, $2, $5 & $10, is issued by Hong Kong Monetary Authority on behalf of the Government of Hong Kong. From 1863 until 1992 these coins were embossed with the reigning British monarch's effigy. Since 1 January 1993, a new series depicting the bauhinia flower was gradually issued, including a new denomination of $10. Since the beginning of the coin replacement programme on 1 January 1993, over 585 million coins featuring Queen Elizabeth II have been withdrawn from circulation. However, these coins remain legal tender.
The total value of coins in circulation in Hong Kong can be found in Monthly Statistical Bulletin and the Annual Report

Historical denominations

Discontinued denominations 
The following coin denominations are no longer circulated by the HKMA.

 The 1 mill coin was discontinued due to its unpopularity.
 1 cent last issued in 1934, but the last mintage which was melted down by the Japanese or lost was dated 1941.
 The 5 cent coin was last issued in 1979 and minted for uncirculated coin sets in 1988.

Denominations with specifications changed 
The following current denominations that have changed in size, shape, and or metal content.

Coins in circulation before 1992 

Queen Victoria series (1866–1901)

King Edward VII series (1902–1910)

King George V series (1911–1936)

King George VI series (1937–1951)

Queen Elizabeth II series (1952–1992)

Coins in circulation since 1993
On New Year's Day (1 January) 1993 at midnight stroke HKT, prior to the officially establishment of the Hong Kong Special Administrative Region, coins with Queen Elizabeth II's portrait was officially remove and delete from circulation. All new banknotes and coins in circulations feature Hong Kong's Bauhinia flower or other symbols. Coins with the Queen's portrait are still legal tender and can be seen, but these are officially removed. However, most still remain in legal tender and are in circulation. Because the redesign was highly sensitive with regard to political and economic reasons, the designing process of the new coins could not be entrusted to an artist but was undertaken by Joseph Yam, Chief Executive of the Hong Kong Monetary Authority, himself who found in the Bauhinia the requested "politically neutral design" and did a secret "scissors and paste job". On New Year's Day (1 January) 1993 at midnight stroke HKT, The new coins was officially launched and introduced along with the new banknotes. On New Year's Day (1 January) 1993 at midnight stroke HKT, Hong Kong dollar officially introduced all new coin designs Hong Kong's Bauhinia flower.

Hong Kong dollar officially introduced a new series of coin on New Year's Day (1 January) 1993 at midnight stroke HKT in denominations of 10-cent, 20-cent, 50-cent, HK$1, HK$2 and HK$10.

Since the introduction of Octopus card in 1997, small value payments and purchases in Hong Kong are mostly done as Octopus transactions. The Hong Kong Monetary Authority from 1998 to 2011, stopped issuing new coinage as the territory had stored enough for use. In 2012, the Hong Kong Monetary Authority resumed the minting of coins of the Bauhinia series after 14 years of non-minting of circulating coins, due in part of increased consumption for coins since 2004 in the territory.

The obverse of each newest coin bears the standard bauhinia, with the word "Hong Kong" in Chinese characters and English. The reverse features the denomination in Chinese characters and English with a large Arabic numeral in the centre and the year of issue below.

Security features
The $10 coin is made of two metals: a white nickel alloy outer ring and a brass inner core. The standard bauhinia on the obverse gives a sharp embossed image. The neat bonding between the outer and inner rings gives it another unique feature. The $10 coin has an alternate plain and milled edge. The $5 coin has a milled edge. A groove running within the milled edging contains raised English and Chinese characters, which read "Hong Kong Five Dollars". The $1 and 50¢ coins have simple milled edges. The $2 and 20¢ coins have scalloped edges. The 10¢ coin has a plain edge. Under Hong Kong law (sections 98 – 102 of Cap. 200), anyone who makes or possesses or controls or passes any counterfeit note or coin commits an offence and is liable on conviction to imprisonment for up to 14 years.

Adopted from the official website of Hong Kong Monetary Authority. Permission granted.

Commemorative coins and coin sets

Commemorative coins issued before 1997 

 Lunar Zodiac Animal coin set, 1976–1986 
 Royal Visit, 1975

 Royal Visit, 1986

 Proof Coin Collection, 1988

Commemorative coins issued after 1997

Opening of the Lantau Link, May 1997 
To mark the opening of the Lantau Link, the HKMA issued a philatelic numismatic cover in May 1997, the first of its kind in Hong Kong. The Lantau Link is the first road link between Lantau Island, where the new airport is located, and the rest of Hong Kong.

Establishment of the Hong Kong Special Administrative Region, July 1997 
To commemorate the establishment of the Hong Kong Special Administrative Region on 1 July 1997, the HKMA, on behalf of the Government, issued a HK$1,000 commemorative proof gold coin, 97,000 proof sets and an unknown number of brilliant uncirculated set of seven coins with the same denominations as the coins currently in circulation. On the obverse side of each of these seven coins is the standard Bauhinia design, with a special commemorative design and denomination on the reverse.

Opening of the Hong Kong International Airport, July 1998 
To mark the opening of the Hong Kong International Airport in July 1998, 15,000 $1,000 commemorative proof gold coin was issued. The gold coin features a design symbolising Hong Kong's ascent into the new century and bears the standard Bauhinia design on the obverse side.

The Five Blessings Commemorative Coin Set, February 2002 
To mark the fifth year of the establishment of the Hong Kong Special Administrative Region, the HKMA, on behalf of the Government, issued 60,000 limited edition coin set that consists of five HK$50 silver coins with a gold-plated inner core, and a 9999 pure gold medallion. The five silver coins are individually engraved with a phrase and symbol of traditional blessing.

Coins sources

List of mints that issued Hong Kong's coins in the past:

 Royal Mint, London
 Royal Mint, Hong Kong branch
 James Watt and Company Soho, Birmingham
 R. Heaton and Sons Limited (now The Mint, Birmingham Limited)
 King's Norton Metal Company Limited

References

 Ma Tak Wo, 2004. Illustrated Catalogue of Hong Kong Currency, Ma Tak Wo Numismatic Co., LTD. Kowloon, Hong Kong.
 Anthony Lee, 2008. Hong Kong Coins Guide (李漢民: 香港錢幣目錄), Collectables AL, Hong Kong.